Lee Min-ji (born May 10, 1991) is a South Korean model and beauty pageant titleholder who was crowned Miss Korea 2015.

Personal life
Lee Min-ji was born in Suwon, South Korea and majored in vocals at Sungshin Women's University.

Miss Korea 2015
Min-ji was crowned Miss Korea 2015 during the Miss Korea 2015 competition held on July 10, 2015.

Filmography

Television series

References

External links
 
 2015 Miss Korea profile

1991 births
Living people
Miss Korea winners
People from Suwon
Sungshin Women's University alumni